Utricularia panamensis is a small carnivorous plant that belongs to the genus Utricularia. U. panamensis, a lithophyte, is endemic to Panama and is only known from the type location and other collections in the same area. It was first described by Peter Taylor in 1977 as Utricularia sp. and later published as U. panamensis in 1986.

See also 
 List of Utricularia species

References 

Carnivorous plants of Central America
Flora of Panama
panamensis
Plants described in 1977